Steven Tahurata Pokere (born 11 August 1958) is a former New Zealand rugby union player. A second five-eighth and centre, Pokere represented Southland, Auckland and Wellington at a provincial level, and was a member of the New Zealand national side, the All Blacks, from 1981 to 1985. He played 39 matches for the All Blacks including 18 internationals.

In 2005, Pokere was sentenced to 2½ years in jail for conspiracy to defraud investors of $NZ4million, relating to a company that he ran with three others, all Mormons, that targeted fellow church members, many of whom were friends and family of the quartet.

References

1958 births
Living people
Rugby union players from Hāwera
People educated at Southland Boys' High School
New Zealand rugby union players
New Zealand international rugby union players
Southland rugby union players
Auckland rugby union players
Wellington rugby union players
Rugby union centres
New Zealanders convicted of fraud
New Zealand Latter Day Saints